Logan family may refer to:

Logan family (historical), a prominent African American family
Logan family (soap opera)
Logan (given name), including a list of people and fictional characters
Logan (surname)
Clan Logan, a Scottish clan